The Ireland cricket team toured Zimbabwe in January 2023 to play three One Day International (ODI) and three Twenty20 International (T20I) matches. Zimbabwe won the T20I series 2–1. The ODI series was drawn 1–1 after the final match ended with no result due to rain.

Squads

Before the start of the series, Ross Adair replaced Lorcan Tucker in Ireland's T20I squad, as Tucker was released to play in the 2022–23 International League T20 (ILT20). Paul Stirling and Josh Little were also missing from Ireland's T20I squad due to their participation in the ILT20 and the 2022–23 SA20, respectively, while Sikander Raza was unavailable for Zimbabwe due to the ILT20. Zimbabwe included former England player Gary Ballance in their T20I squad. Ireland captain Andrew Balbirnie suffered a concussion during the first ODI, after scoring his eighth century in the format, which ruled him out of the remainder of the series. Murray Commins replaced Balbirnie in Ireland's squad for the last two ODIs, and Paul Stirling took over as captain.

T20I series

1st T20I

2nd T20I

3rd T20I

ODI series

1st ODI

2nd ODI

3rd ODI

Notes

References

External Links
Series home at ESPN Cricinfo

International cricket competitions in 2022–23
2023 in Zimbabwean cricket
2023 in Irish cricket
Irish cricket tours of Zimbabwe